Cox Green may refer to:

Cox Green, Berkshire, civil parish in the Windsor and Maidenhead district
Cox Green School, school in Maidenhead
Cox Green, Greater Manchester, village near Bolton
Cox Green, Surrey, the northern part of Rudgwick in West Sussex, some of which is in Surrey
Cox Green, Tyne and Wear, village in the City of Sunderland, Tyne and Wear
Cox Green Footbridge, footbridge across the River Wear at Cox Green, Sunderland